Parliamentary elections were held in the Nagorno-Karabakh Republic on 30 April 1995. A total of 33 members of the National Assembly were elected. Voter turnout was 73.9%.

References

Nagorno
Nagorno
1995 in the Nagorno-Karabakh Republic
Elections in the Republic of Artsakh
Election and referendum articles with incomplete results